John David Mumford (born December 25, 1956) is an American football coach and former player. He was most recently the defensive line coach at New Mexico State University. Mumford served as the head football coach at Southeast Missouri State University from 1990 to 1999, as the interim head football coach at the United States Military Academy for seven games in 2003, and as the interim head football coach at the University of Louisiana at Monroe for three games in 2015.

Head coaching record

College

Notes

References

External links
 New Mexico State profile

1956 births
Living people
American football tight ends
Army Black Knights football coaches
Coaches of American football from Kansas
High school football coaches in Alabama
Kansas Jayhawks football coaches
Louisiana–Monroe Warhawks football coaches
New Mexico State Aggies football coaches
Pittsburg State Gorillas football players
Players of American football from Kansas
South Dakota Coyotes football coaches
Southeast Missouri State Redhawks football coaches